Kimberley McRae (born May 24, 1992) is a Canadian luger who has competed since 2011 on the Senior FIL World Cup Circuit McRae competed for Canada at the 2014 Winter Olympics in Sochi, Russia and at the 2018 Winter Olympics in PyeongChang, South Korea.

References

External links
 
 Kimberley McRae at Luge Canada
 
 
 
 

1992 births
Living people
Canadian female lugers
Olympic lugers of Canada
Lugers at the 2014 Winter Olympics
Lugers at the 2018 Winter Olympics
Sportspeople from Victoria, British Columbia